Ariefusus is a genus of sea snails, marine gastropod mollusks in the subfamily Fusininae of the family Fasciolariidae, the spindle snails, the tulip snails and their allies.

Species
Species within the genus Ariefusus include:
 † Ariefusus prevosti (Hörnes, 1853) 
 Ariefusus rutilus (Nicolay & Berthelot, 1996)
 † Ariefusus szobiensis (Strausz, 1960)

References

 Vermeij G.J. & Snyder M.A. (2018). Proposed genus-level classification of large species of Fusininae (Gastropoda, Fasciolariidae). Basteria. 82(4-6): 57-82

 
Gastropod genera